KeAndre Bates (born May 24, 1996) is an American track and field athlete who competes in the triple jump with a personal record of  and Long jump . Bates is a 3-time NCAA champion, 14-time NCAA Division 1 All-American and 3-time SEC champion. Bates represented  at 2013 World Youth Championships in Athletics, 2015 Pan American Junior Athletics Championships, 2016 NACAC Under-23 Championships, and 2018 NACAC Championships.

Career
Bates earned his place among World's top triple jumpers before graduation from Florida. Bates earned fourteen NCAA Division 1 All-American as a college student-athlete. He earned an athletic scholarship to attended University of Florida and competed for the Florida Gators men's track and field.

Personal Biography
KeAndre Bates was born in Temple, Texas, United States, and attended Burges High School'14 as a University Interscholastic League Texas 4A two sport athlete (football and Track and Field) before committing to Florida Gators track and field.

References

External links

2018 KeAndre Bates Interview after 3rd Place Men's Triple Jump - USATF Outdoor Championships - University of Florida (track and field) USATF.tv
98.1 FM 850 AM WRUF Florida Radio coverage ESPN ESPN Radio
2018 KeAndre Bates Interview before 2018 USATF Outdoor Championships after NCAA Outdoor Championships University of Florida

Living people
1996 births
Track and field athletes from Texas
American male triple jumpers
African-American male track and field athletes
Florida Gators men's track and field athletes
Sportspeople from El Paso, Texas
USA Indoor Track and Field Championships winners
21st-century African-American sportspeople